Alejandro Springall  is a Mexican film director and producer.

Springall studied filmmaking at the London Film School. He returned to Mexico City in 1991 and started working with Mexican film producer Bertha Navarro, from whom he learned most of his producing skills. Springall started his career as a producer, but in 1996 he directed his first feature film, Santitos. Since 1996 Springall has been collaborating with John Sayles, Maggie Renzi and Lemore Syvan. Results of that collaboration have been: Men with Guns, directed by Sayles, produced by Renzi, where Springall translated the script into Spanish and played a small role next to Federico Luppi; Santitos was executive produced by Sayles, Renzi and Syvan; Casa de los Babys, directed by Sayles was produced by Syvan and Springall; Morirse está en hebreo (My Mexican Shivah) was executive produced by Sayles, Renzi and Syvan; and Springall's new project, Air & Fire, was re-written by Sayles.

In 2003, Springall produced and directed the grand concert of Chavela Vargas at Carnegie Hall, New York; and in 2004, he directed the grand concert of Chavela Vargas at Luna Park Stadium, Buenos Aires, Argentina.

Director filmography
 Santitos (1998)
 Morirse está en hebreo (My Mexican Shivah) (2006)
 No eres tú, soy yo (It's Not You, It's Me) (2010)
 200 años de mexican@s en movimiento (2010)
 The Devil's Highway (2018)

Producer, co-producer and line producer filmography
 Cronos (La Invención de Cronos) (1993)
 Dollar Mambo (1993)
 Someone Else's America (1994)
 De tripas, corazón (1995)
 Santitos (1999)
 Frida (2002)
 Casa de los Babys (2003)
 Morirse está en hebreo (My Mexican Shivah) (2006)
 No eres tú, soy yo (It's Not You, It's Me) (2010)
 200 años de mexican@s en movimiento (2010)

External links

Living people
Mexican film directors
Mexican film producers
Spanish-language film directors
People from Mexico City
Mexican people of English descent
Year of birth missing (living people)